The Schubert P-1 is a sailplane produced in Brazil, designed by the aeronautical engineer Ekkehard Schubert.

Design and development 
The fuselage construction is made of FRP, in single shell, with two caverns for fixing the wing and the landing gear. The fuselage structure includes the drift structure, whose surface is made of FRP and PVC foam sandwich. The rear spar of the drift, with FRP tables (uni-directional fabric or roving) and FRP sandwich core supported by PVC foam, closes the entire structure. The wing-fuselage connection is made by means of the two caverns, in which the half-wings are connected by means of two wing-wing connecting pins.

The three-dimensional geometry of the fuselage cabin is derived from a two-dimensional profile, accommodated in the flow of the wing. Negative camber at -1.7 m, at the wing tip, measured at the aileron articulation axis. Schempp-Hirth brakes on the extrados.

The first flight of the P1 was on March 3, 2002, at CTA in São José dos Campos.

Specifications

See also

References

External links
J2mcL Website

2000s Brazilian sailplanes
Aircraft first flown in 2002